Trubar is a village in the municipality of Bihać, Bosnia and Herzegovina.

The village was the site of the Trubar massacre, which took place in July 1941.

Demographics 
According to the 2013 census, its population was 64.

References

Populated places in Bihać